Widow maker, widow-maker or widowmaker may refer to:

Common usage
 Widowmaker (forestry), any loose overhead debris such as limbs or tree tops that may fall at any time
 Widow maker (medicine), a nickname used to describe a highly stenotic left main coronary artery or proximal left anterior descending (LAD) coronary artery of the heart, which is very often fatal

Entertainment

Film and television
 K-19: The Widowmaker, a 2002 historical submarine film
 Widowmaker Cave, a fictional cave in the Northern Exposure episode "The Final Frontier"
 The Widowmaker, a 1990 TV drama by John Madden
 "Widowmaker" (American Dad!), a season 4 episode of American Dad!

Books and comics
 Widowmaker (Marvel Comics), a 2010–2011 four-issue comic book limited series
 The Widowmaker, a 1996 science-fiction novel by Mike Resnick

Characters
 Widowmaker (Image Comics), an assassin from the comic book series Noble Causes
 Widow-Maker, Pecos Bill's horse in American folklore
 Widowmaker, a military unit in Resistance: Fall of Man and Resistance 3
 Widow-maker, a Decepticon heavy from Marvel's Transformers franchise
 Widowmaker (Overwatch), a character from the 2016 video game
 The Widowmaker, an ace starfighter pilot in the video game Colony Wars: Vengeance

Music
 Widowmaker (U.K. band), a British hard rock band
 Widowmaker (album), a 1976 album by Widowmaker
 Widowmaker (Dee Snider band), an American band
 Widow Maker, a 1964 album and song by Jimmy Martin
 Widowmaker, a 2012 album by Dragged into Sunlight
 "The Widow Maker", a 1974 song by Robert Calvert from Captain Lockheed and the Starfighters
 "Widowmaker", a 1983 song by Pantera from Metal Magic
 "Widowmaker", a 1985 song by W.A.S.P. from The Last Command
 The Widowmaker, an album and song by Canadian singer-songwriter Donovan Woods
 "Widowmaker", a 2017 song by The Black Dahlia Murder from Nightbringers

Vehicles and weaponry
 Widowmaker, the Porsche 930, the first mass-produced turbocharged version
 Widowmaker, the ArmaLite AR-18 assault rifle
 Widowmaker, the Winchester Model 1911 shotgun
 Widowmaker, the Martin B-26 Marauder, a medium bomber. In the early stage of its service. B-26s were hard to control and forced Martin company to redesign the wing.
 Widowmaker, the Lockheed F-104 Starfighter, an interceptor aircraft, quite hard to control and not suitable for inexperienced pilot. Many F-104 users suffered accidents during their F-104 service histories.
 Widow maker, the McDonnell Douglas AV-8B Harrier II, a V/STOL ground-attack aircraft

Other uses
 Widowmaker hill climb, a motorcycle/snowmobile sporting event in Croydon, Utah
 Widowmaker, the bowsprit, a part of a sailing ship
 Widowmaker, African buffalo
 The Widowmaker, Delamar, Nevada, a former town
 The Widowmaker, Barry Windham, a wrestler

See also
 Window Maker